Pholiderpeton (from  , 'horny scale' and  , 'creeping thing') is an extinct genus of embolomere amphibian which lived in the Late Carboniferous period (Bashkirian) of England. The genus was first named by Thomas Henry Huxley in 1869 to include the species P. scutigerum, based on the disarticulated front half of a skeleton discovered near Bradford, Yorkshire. Associated fossil wood suggests that this specimen died inside a Lepidodendron tree trunk.

In 1987, Jennifer A. Clack suggested that a different embolomere, Eogyrinus attheyi from Newsham, Northumberland, belonged to the same genus as Pholiderpeton. She subsumed the genus Eogyrinus into Pholiderpeton and created the new combination P. attheyi. The anatomy of "Eogyrinus" attheyi has been described in detail by A.L. Panchen. Some phylogenetic analyses, such as those by Marcello Ruta & Michael Coates (2007) and David Marjanović & Michel Laurin (2019), have argued that Pholiderpeton scutigerum and "Eogyrinus" attheyi were not closely related to each other. However, neither publication reinstated the genus Eogyrinus.

The latter species was thus among the largest Carboniferous tetrapods, and perhaps one of the largest of its family, the Eogyrinidae.

References

Basal tetrapods of Europe
Embolomeres
Carboniferous reptiliomorphs